Qaleh-ye Lever Pump Complex ( – Mojtame` Tolombeh Hāy Keshāvarzy Qal‘eh Lever) is a village in Howmeh Rural District, in the Central District of Andimeshk County, Khuzestan Province, Iran. At the 2006 census, its population was 152, in 32 families.

References 

Populated places in Andimeshk County